The geographical mile is an international unit of length determined by 1 minute of arc degreealong the Earth's equator. For the international ellipsoid 1924 this equalled 1855.4 metres. In any ellipsoid, the length of a degree of longitude at the equator is thus exactly 60 geographical miles.

The shape of the Earth is a slightly flattened sphere, which results in the Earth's circumference being 0.168% larger when measured around the equator as compared to through the poles.

Historical units
Historically, certain nations used slightly different divisions to create their geographical miles.

The Portuguese system derived their miles as one third of their league of three separate values. When each equatorial degree was divided into 18 leagues, the geographical mile was equal to  degree or about 2.06 km; when divided into 20 leagues, the geographical mile was equal to  degree, approximating the values provided above; and when divided into 25 leagues, the geographical mile was equal to  degree or about 1.48 km.

The geographical miles of the traditional Dutch, German ( or ), and Danish systems all approximated their much longer milesequivalent to English leaguesby using a larger division of the equatorial degree. Instead of using one minute of arc, they all used four degreeto produce a distance now notionally equal to 7408 m but actually differing slightly depending on official measurements and computations. (For example, the Danish unit was computed as equivalent to about 7,421.5 m by the astronomer Ole Rømer.)

Relationship with the nautical mile

The geographical mile is closely related to the nautical mile, which was originally determined as 1 minute of arc along a great circle of the Earth but is nowadays defined by treaty as exactly 1852 m. The US National Institute of Standards and Technology notes that "The international nautical mile of 1,852 meters (6,076.115 49... feet) was adopted effective July 1, 1954, for use in the United States. The value formerly used in the United States was 6,080.20 feet = 1 nautical (geographical or sea) mile."

Scandinavians used their own version of the geographical mile as their nautical mile up to the beginning of the 20th century, causing it to be more well known as the sea mile in Danish, Norwegian, and Swedish.

Use
The unit is not used much in English-speaking countries but is cited in some United States laws. For example, Section 1301(a) of the Submerged Lands Act defines state seaward boundaries in terms of geographic miles.  While debating what became the Land Ordinance of 1785, Thomas Jefferson's committee wanted to divide the public lands in the west into "hundreds of ten geographical miles square, each mile containing 6,086 and 4-10ths of a foot" and "sub-divided into lots of one mile square each, or 850 and 4-10ths of an acre".

See also
Conversion of units
Medieval weights and measures for details of the geographical league of France
Mile for the various other miles in use
Nautical mile

References

Units of length